Iván Salas (born December 30, 1990) is a Mexican professional baseball pitcher for the Guerreros de Oaxaca of the Mexican League.

Professional career

Piratas de Campeche
Salas began his career with the Piratas de Campeche of the Mexican League in 2009. On December 31, 2009, Salas elected free agency. On March 11, 2011, Salas re-signed with the Piratas. Salas played with Campeche through the 2018 season, pitching to a cumulative 3.57 ERA with 170 strikeouts in 242.0 innings pitched across 9 seasons with the team.

Sultanes de Monterrey
On May 20, 2021, Salas signed with the Sultanes de Monterrey of the Mexican League. Appearing in 29 games, he posted a 4.08 ERA with 20 strikeouts in 28.2 innings pitched.

Pericos de Puebla
On April 21, 2022, Salas signed with the Pericos de Puebla. He made 10 appearances for the club, pitching to a 4.63 ERA with 10 strikeouts in 11.2 innings pitched.

Sultanes de Monterrey (second stint)
On May 17, 2022, Salas was traded back to the Sultanes de Monterrey. In 14 games down the stretch, Salas worked to a 1-0 record and 2.77 ERA with 10 strikeouts in 13.0 innings pitched.

Guerreros de Oaxaca
On January 30, 2023, Salas signed with the Guerreros de Oaxaca of the Mexican League.

International career
Salas was chosen for the Mexico national baseball team at the 2017 World Baseball Classic.

References

External links

1990 births
Living people
Algodoneros de Guasave players
Baseball players from Sonora
Charros de Jalisco players
Mexican League baseball pitchers
People from Navojoa
Pericos de Puebla players
Piratas de Campeche players
Sultanes de Monterrey players
2017 World Baseball Classic players